"Missin' You" is a song written by Kye Fleming and Dennis Morgan, and recorded by American country music artist Charley Pride.  It was released in October 1979 as the second single from his album You're My Jamaica. The song peaked at number 2 on the Billboard Hot Country Singles chart.

Charts

Weekly charts

Year-end charts

References

1979 singles
1979 songs
Charley Pride songs
RCA Records singles
Songs written by Dennis Morgan (songwriter)
Songs written by Kye Fleming